Dr. Lars Hafner has been described as an innovative leader in public service and education. While serving 12 years in the Florida Legislature, Hafner spent the entirety of his legislative career as a member of the Florida House Appropriations Committee. He developed a reputation for fiscal prudence and helped write, negotiate, debate and pass a multi-billion-dollar budget’s each year of service. Dr. Hafner authored and led to passage significant pieces of legislation in the areas of education, ethics, health, workforce, environment and human services. For his work on these and other issues he received numerous awards including a Lifetime Legislative Achievement Award.

Hafner has shared his experience by leading legislative trainings in various states, including Florida, Michigan, Colorado, Vermont, Idaho and Washington DC connecting him to various networks nationwide. His expertise focuses on value driven messaging, communications and leadership.  He continues to consult for education and political concerns. Hafner also enjoys writing the occasional guest column for several Florida newspapers. Over the years, Hafner’s commitment to the community has led him to serve on various advisory boards and boards of directors.
  
Hafner has spent his personal and professional career committed to serving the community and advancing the Florida community college system from every perspective. He has been a student, faculty member, Phi Theta Kappa advisor, athletic director, vice president, provost and president.

Hafner served as President of the State College of Florida, Manatee-Sarasota, the area’s oldest and largest public institution.  As President, he worked extensively with state and local governments on workforce, partnerships, policy and budgetary issues. He transitioned a two-year college into a four-year state college offering workforce baccalaureate degrees. Hafner also started the first of its kind 6-12th grade charter school for “first time in college” generation students.

Prior to assuming the SCF presidency, Dr. Hafner served as the Provost for the St. Petersburg College’s St. Petersburg/Gibbs campus which included overseeing the SPC Midtown and Downtown Centers, along with the Palladium. He also as SPC’s Vice President for Education and Student Services. He co-conceived, designed and promoted the University Partnership Center (UPC) at St. Petersburg College, which hosted 18 colleges and universities offering 84 full-degree programs including bachelor’s, master’s and doctorate degrees. Hafner started his career as a faculty member at St. Petersburg College and remains a committed alumnus.

Dr. Hafner also serves as the political expert for Tampa Bay’s CBS affiliate - WTSP Channel 10, the countries 11th largest media market. Hafner analyzes federal, state and local politics, with a focus on both policy and campaigns/elections.

Raised in St. Petersburg, Florida, Hafner received an Associate in Arts degree from then St. Petersburg Junior College, a bachelor's degree from State University of New York at Buffalo and a master's degree from the University of Maryland. He received a Ph.D. in leadership and education/higher education administration from Barry University. 

Hafner Chaired the City of St. Petersburg Charter Review Commission. The Commission meets every 10 years to review the city charter. The nine member commission was appointed by the Mayor and City Council members. 

On November 9, 2021 Dr. Hafner was presented the key to the city of St. Petersburg by Mayor Rick Kriseman. The Key was given for Hafner's contributions to the city in the areas of policy through politics, education through collaboration and civic and community engagement.

On August 1, 2022 Dr. Hafner was named Professor Emeritus for St. Petersburg College. He was selected for his commitment to students and the teaching profession.

References

Year of birth missing (living people)
Living people